Binuluangan (historically Balin) is an inhabited island-barangay in northeastern Iloilo, Philippines. It is one of fourteen islands politically administered by the municipality of Carles. In 2010 it had a population of 1,682. There is an elementary school on the island.

Location and geography 

Binuluangan is a wooded island northeast of the Panay Island coast in the Visayan Sea. Binuluangan is surrounded by several small islands and islets, including Tabugon and Tabugon Chico to the north, Himamylan and Adcalayo to the south, and Nilidlaran (variously Linadlaran) to the southeast.

Natural disasters

Typhoon Haiyan

See also 

 List of islands in the Philippines

References

External links
 Binuluangan Island at OpenStreetMap

Islands of Iloilo
Barangays of Iloilo